Ward McAllister (1891–1981) was an American film actor of the silent era.
He was born in Apollo, Pennsylvania, as Ward David McAllister. In 1922 he appeared as the villain (based on Brilliant Chang) in the controversial British crime film Cocaine.

Selected filmography
 General John Regan (1921)
 A Woman of No Importance (1921)
 Cocaine (1922)
 Trapped by the Mormons (1922)
 Repentance (1922)
 The Engineer's Thumb (1923)

References

External links

1891 births
1981 deaths
American male silent film actors
Male actors from Pennsylvania
People from Armstrong County, Pennsylvania
20th-century American male actors